Nicholas Phillip Ebanks (born 27 June 1990) is a Caymanian footballer who plays as a defender. He  has represented the Cayman Islands during the 2010 Caribbean Championship and World Cup qualifying matches in 2011.

References

Association football defenders
Living people
1990 births
Caymanian footballers
Cayman Islands international footballers
George Town SC players